Dermanehzar-e Do (also Romanized as Dermanehzār-e Do; also known as Dermanehzār) is a village in Band-e Amir Rural District, Zarqan District, Shiraz County, Fars Province, Iran. At the 2006 census, its population was 128, in 33 families.

References 

Populated places in Zarqan County